The men's 3,200 metres steeplechase was held for the only time at the 1908 Summer Olympics in London. The competition was held on July 17, 1908, and July 18, 1908. The races were held on a track of 536.45 metres= mile in circumference. There were six heats of the first round, with the winners of those heats competing in the final.

24 runners from 6 nations competed; eleven from Great Britain, eight from the United States, two from Canada, two from France, one from Hungary, and one from Italy. NOCs could enter up to 12 athletes.

Records

These were the standing world and Olympic records (in minutes) prior to the 1908 Summer Olympics.

(*) The distance of this race was 2500 metres and the track was 500 metres in circumference.

(**) The distance of this race was 2590 metres and the track was 536.45 metres= mile in circumference.

Results

First round

All first round heats were held on Friday, July 17, 1908.

Heat 1

Russell beat Cartasegna by 100 yards. Downing was disqualified for incorrectly clearing the first water jump, while Ragueneau dropped out on the second lap and Carr injured his ankle.

Heat 2

Eisele was the only one to finish: de Fleurac led early, but was caught before the water jump and pulled up lame, while English fell and Lovas and Buckley dropped out trying to keep the pace.

Heat 3

Barker pulled up lame on the last lap, leaving Galbraith with the win.

Heat 4

With Yorke being disqualified for obstruction and Bonhag injured, the race was between Robertson and Dull. Dull led at first, but Robertson passed him and won by two hundred yards.

Heat 5

The Americans had little chance of catching up with Holdaway and Kinchin; Holdaway was a hundred yards ahead at the finish.

Heat 6

After Fitzgerald fell and Grantham pulled up lame, Sewell and Lightbody competed right up to the finish, when Sewell pulled away at the end to win a tight race by less than ten yards.

Final

The final was held on Saturday, July 18, 1908.

Holdaway was the first to lead, but did not do so for long. Galbraith and Russell were the leaders for most of the first half of the race, until Galbraith fell back and Eisele joined Russell at the front. After the bell, Robertson passed Eisele and nearly caught Russell, trailing by only two yards when the two crossed the finish line.

References

Sources
 
 
 

Athletics at the 1908 Summer Olympics
Steeplechase at the Olympics